The obex (from the Latin for barrier) is the point in the human brain at which the fourth ventricle narrows to become the central canal of the spinal cord. Cerebrospinal fluid can flow from the fourth ventricle into the obex. In anatomical studies, the obex has been found to occur approximately 10-12 mm above the level of the foramen magnum. In patients with low tonsillar position, the obex has been found below the plane of the foramen magnum.

The obex occurs in the caudal medulla.

The decussation of sensory fibers happens at this point.

Clinical significance
Lesions at the location can result in obstructive hydrocephalus. The most common lesion at this location is a subependymoma, a benign tumor. Hemangioblastoma has been observed in this location.

Detection of prions
Immunohistochemistry (IHC) to test brain, lymph, and neuroendocrine tissues for the presence of the abnormal prion protein to diagnose wasting diseases like chronic wasting disease in deer. Positive IHC findings in the obex is considered the gold standard.

Additional images

References

Ventricular system
Medulla oblongata